Magic & Mayhem: The Art of Magic is a 2001 video game developed by Charybdis Limited and published by Virgin Interactive. It is a sequel to 1998's Magic and Mayhem.

Development
The game was announced in May 2000. It went gold on October 10, 2001.

Reception

The game holds a score of 71% on Metacritic based on 14 reviews.

Computer Gaming World gave the game a score of 4 of 5 stating "Art of Magic conjures up an engaging mix of tactical combat and RPG game play with good replay value thanks to skirmish and multiplayer options"

References

External links

2001 video games
Bethesda Softworks games
Fantasy video games
Multiplayer and single-player video games
Real-time strategy video games
Video games based on Arthurian legend
Video games based on Celtic mythology
Video games based on Greek mythology
Video games scored by Jim Croft
Video game sequels
Virgin Interactive games
Windows games
Windows-only games
Video games developed in the United Kingdom